Delko Bogdanić (27 August 1910 – 30 November 1945) was a Croatian military officer who served in army of Ustaše and later in Crusaders guerilla army.

Biography 
Delko was born on 27 August 1910 in Ličko Lešće, he attended high school in Senj. After finishing high school he became a merchant. He participated in Velebit uprising. After the establishment of the Independent State of Croatia, he became a military officer in its armed forces. He commanded various units, most notable being 4th Standing Active Brigade. After the fall of NDH, he commanded a group of Crusaders guerrillas. His group operated in Velebit area. He committed suicide after his dugout was surrounded by OZNA forces.

References 

1910 births
1945 suicides
Ustaša Militia personnel
Suicides in Croatia